Phillip Peter Dutton, OAM (born 13 September 1963) is an Australian-born Olympic-level equestrian rider competing in eventing for the United States of America. He is a dual Olympic gold medalist who formerly competed for his country of birth but now competes for the USA.

Biography
Dutton was born in Nyngan and was educated at Newington College (1976–1979). He pursued his passion for riding in Australia until 1991 when he moved to the United States to train in a more internationally competitive environment. In the 1996 Atlanta and 2000 Sydney Olympic Games he was a member of Australia's Gold Medal Three-day Eventing Team and he has now represented Australia in three Olympics and four World Equestrian Games. He is very active on the U.S. eventing circuit, winning the USEA Leading Rider of the Year title in 1998, and 2000, 2001, 2002, 2003, 2004, 2005, and 2006. In 2005 he was also the number one FEI World Event Rider. Phillip and his wife, Evie, live in Avondale, Pennsylvania with Evie's daughter and their twin girls. Dutton's farm, True Prospect Farm, is located in West Grove, Pennsylvania.

In 2006, Dutton announced that he would be changing his citizenship, allowing him to ride for the United States. In his letter to the EFA, informing them of the change, he wrote: "I would like to thank the EFA for everything they have done for me and my career as a Three-Day Event rider... It has been an honour to be a member of the EFA and to represent Australia internationally for the past 12 years."

In April 2007, Dutton took second at the famous 4 star event the Rolex Kentucky Three Day, as his first time riding for the U.S. Later that year, he won the team gold and individual silver medal at the 2007 Pan American Games on Truluck.

In April 2008, Dutton broke the "Rolex Hex" winning his first Rolex Kentucky Three-Day Event.  Dutton competed at the 2008 Summer Olympics, but was disqualified from the individual event for competing with boots that were too heavy.

On 24 May 2016 it was announced that Dutton would be working with Kentucky Derby runner-up Commanding Curve in his 2nd career as an eventing horse.

Dutton and Mighty Nice won an individual bronze medal in the 2016 Summer Olympics in Rio de Janeiro.

Recognition
In 1997, Dutton was awarded the Medal of the Order of Australia. He was inducted into the Sport Australia Hall of Fame in 2001.

CCI 5* Results

International Championship results

Notable Horses

 True Blue Girdwood
 1994 World Equestrian Games – Team Fourth Place, Individual 18th Place
 1996 Atlanta Olympics – Team Gold Medal
 1998 World Equestrian Games – Individual 17th Place
 House Doctor – 1992 Bay Gelding
 2000 Sydney Olympics – Team Gold Medal
 2002 World Equestrian Games – Individual Fifth Place
 Nova Top – 1991 Chestnut Gelding (RA Nova)
 2003 Asian Pacific Championships – Team Gold Medal, Individual Gold Medal
 2004 Athens Olympics – Team Sixth Place, Individual 13th Place
 2005 FEI World Cup Final – Ninth Place
 Connaught – 1993 Bay Irish Sport Horse Gelding (Ballysimon x Royal Rogue)
 2006 World Equestrian Games – Individual 30th Place
 2008 Kentucky CCI**** Winner
 2008 Beijing Olympics – Team Seventh Place
 Truluck – 1997 Bay Thoroughbred Gelding (Maha Baba x Full Choke)
 2007 Pan American Games – Team Gold Medal, Individual Silver Medal
 Woodburn – 1996 Chestnut Thoroughbred Gelding (Herewood The Wake x Sir Tritram)
 2010 World Equestrian Games – Team Fourth Place, Individual 18th Place
 Mystery Whisper – 2000 Dark Bay Warmblood Gelding (Richmeed Medallion x Salute)
 2012 London Olympics – Team Seventh Place, Individual 23rd Place
 Fernhill Fugitive – 2005 Bay Irish Sport Horse Gelding (Lux x Ramiro B)
 2015 Pan American Games – Team Gold Medal, Individual 10th Place
 Mighty Nice – 2004 Bay Irish Sport Horse Gelding (Ard Ohio)
 2016 Rio Olympics – Team 12th Place, Individual Bronze Medal

References

External links
 Dutton's personal website

1963 births
Living people
Australian event riders
Olympic equestrians of Australia
American male equestrians
Australian male equestrians
Olympic gold medalists for Australia
Olympic bronze medalists for the United States in equestrian
Equestrians at the 1996 Summer Olympics
Equestrians at the 2000 Summer Olympics
Equestrians at the 2004 Summer Olympics
Equestrians at the 2007 Pan American Games
Equestrians at the 2008 Summer Olympics
Equestrians at the 2012 Summer Olympics
Equestrians at the 2015 Pan American Games
Equestrians at the 2016 Summer Olympics
American event riders
People educated at Newington College
Recipients of the Medal of the Order of Australia
Sport Australia Hall of Fame inductees
Medalists at the 2016 Summer Olympics
Medalists at the 2000 Summer Olympics
Medalists at the 1996 Summer Olympics
Pan American Games gold medalists for the United States
Pan American Games medalists in equestrian
Medalists at the 2015 Pan American Games
Equestrians at the 2020 Summer Olympics
21st-century Australian people